Kim Jin-yi may refer to:
 Kim Jin-yi (handballer)
 Kim Jin-yi (actress)